Goin' Nuts  is a pinball machine that was designed by Adolf Seitz, Jr. for Gottlieb in 1983. 
The game never went into production and only 10 prototypes were built.

Description
The game is unique in that it has no outlanes. Also, the game starts as 3-ball multiball with auto-plunger instead of a plunger; once the player started the game all three balls are released and objective is to knock down the set of drop targets in order to score points and build up time. Rather than counting balls, a player's score is determined based on the amount of time left on the timer which counts down when there's only 1 ball left.

Disadvantages of this pinball machine include damage of the playfield and toys by multiple balls nicking each other. A good player may also build up too much time which leads to lower income for the machine owner.

Design team
 Game Design: Adolf Seitz Jr.
 Artwork: unidentified artist at Advertising Posters of Chicago

Digital versions
Goin' Nuts is available as a licensed table of The Pinball Arcade for several platforms and the game was also included in the Pinball Hall of Fame: The Gottlieb Collection for the Nintendo Wii system.

References

External links
 Internet Pinball Database entry for Goin' Nuts

1983 pinball machines
Gottlieb pinball machines